Euzopherodes keltella is a species of snout moth in the genus Euzopherodes. It was described by Hans Georg Amsel in 1935. It is found in the Palestinian territories and Israel.

References

Moths described in 1935
Phycitini